Events in the year 2000 in Gabon.

Incumbents 

 President: Omar Bongo Ondimba
 Prime Minister: Jean-François Ntoutoume Emane

Events 

 March 12 – The country competed at the 2000 Summer Olympics in Sydney, Australia.
 September 20 – E.G.F. civil engineering company is founded.

Deaths

References 

Wallechinsky, David (2004). The Complete Book of the Summer Olympics (Athens 2004 Edition). Toronto, Canada. . 
International Olympic Committee (2001). The Results. Retrieved 12 November 2005.
Sydney Organising Committee for the Olympic Games (2001). Official Report of the XXVII Olympiad Volume 1: Preparing for the Games. Retrieved 20 November 2005.
Sydney Organising Committee for the Olympic Games (2001). Official Report of the XXVII Olympiad Volume 2: Celebrating the Games. Retrieved 20 November 2005.
Sydney Organising Committee for the Olympic Games (2001). The Results. Retrieved 20 November 2005.
International Olympic Committee Web Site

 
2000s in Gabon
Years of the 21st century in Gabon
Gabon